M. Pokora originally titled Matt Pokora is the debut album of French R&B singer M. Pokora, released November 2, 2004.

M. Pokora was forced to change the title to M. Pokora after a lawsuit from French Guadeloupan artist Matt Houston, who alleged using the name Matt by Matt Pokora would create confusion and was infringement on his own rights to the name.

Track listing

References

2004 debut albums
M. Pokora albums